FMSR may refer to
 Distribution Management System#Fault Management & System Restoration (FMSR)
 Federated Malay States Railways
 Morombe Airport, ICAO code FMSR